Feline disease are those infections or diseases that infect cats. Some of these cause symptoms, sickness or the death of the animal. Some of these are symptomatic in a cat but not in other cats. Some are opportunistic and tend to be more serious in cats that already have other sicknesses. Some of these can be treated and the animal can have a complete recovery. Others, like viral diseases, cannot be treated with antibiotics. This is because antibiotics are not effective against viruses.

Aspergillosis
Avian influenza in cats
Bladder cancer in cats and dogs
Bone cancer in cats and dogs
Cancer in cats
Cat flu, an upper respiratory tract infection, caused by:
Bordetella bronchiseptica
Chlamydophila felis
Feline calicivirus
Feline viral rhinotracheitis (FVR)
FHV-1 
Cat-scratch disease
Cat skin disorders
Central retinal degeneration
Coccidia
Cowpox
Cryptosporidiosis
Cuterebriasis
Diabetes in cats
Dirofilaria immitis
Dry eye syndrome
Ectopia lentis
Eosinophilic granuloma
Feline acne
Feline asthma
Feline cognitive dysfunction
Feline coronavirus
Feline cystitis
Feline cutaneous asthenia
Feline distemper
Feline foamy virus
Feline hepatic lipidosis
Feline hyperadrenocorticism
Feline hyperaldosteronism
Feline hyperesthesia syndrome
Feline hyperthyroidism
Feline hypoadrenocorticism
Feline immunodeficiency virus
Feline infectious anemia
Feline infectious peritonitis
Feline leprosy syndrome caused by Mycobacterium lepraemurium
Feline leptospirosis
Feline leukemia virus
Feline lower urinary tract disease
Feline lymphoma
Feline odontoclastic resorptive lesion
Feline panleukopenia
Feline sarcoma virus
Feline spongiform encephalopathy
Feline viral enteritis 
Flat-chested kitten syndrome
Flea allergy dermatitis
Flea-borne spotted fever caused by Rickettsia felisFlorida keratopathyHaemophilus felisHead pressing
Heart valve dysplasia
Hookworm infection
Hypertrophic cardiomyopathy
Leishmaniasis
Luxating patella
Lyme disease
Lymphocytopenia
Mastocytoma
Miliary dermatitis
Otitis externa in animals
Paragonimus
Polyneuropathy in dogs and cats 
Portosystemic shunt
Protothecosis
Pseudorabies (Morbus Aujeszky), originating from swine
Psychogenic alopecia
Pyometra
Rabies
Retinitis pigmentosa
Salmonellosis
Tetanus
Thelaziasis
Toxocariasis
Toxoplasmosis caused by Toxoplasma gondiiTritrichomonas blagburni''
Tyzzer's disease
Vaccine-associated sarcoma

See also
Cat health

References

Feline